Hengshui (572) is a Type 054A frigate of the People's Liberation Army Navy. She was commissioned on 26 December 2012.

Development and design 

The Type 054A carries HQ-16 medium-range air defence missiles and anti-submarine missiles in a vertical launching system (VLS) system. The HQ-16 has a range of up to 50 km, with superior range and engagement angles to the Type 054's HQ-7. The Type 054A's VLS uses a hot launch method; a shared common exhaust system is sited between the two rows of rectangular launching tubes.

The four AK-630 close-in weapon systems (CIWS) of the Type 054 were replaced with two Type 730 CIWS on the Type 054A. The autonomous Type 730 provides improved reaction time against close-in threats.

Construction and career 
Hengshui was launched in 2011 at the Huangpu Shipyard in Shanghai. Commissioned on 9 July 2012.

On March 19, 2013, Hengshui, Lanzhou, Yulin, and Jinggang Shan form an open sea training formation that left a military port in Sanya and went to the South China Sea and the West. The Pacific Ocean and other waters conducted combat readiness patrol training in the open sea. The joint mobile formation successively sailed through the Xisha, Nansha, Zengmu Ansha, Bashi Channel, Western Pacific and other sea areas, and successively patrolled Zhubi Reef, Nanxun Reef, Dongmen Reef, Chigua Reef, Yongshu Reef and Huayang Reef. Reefs and other Nansha islands and reefs. The open sea training lasted 16 days and nights and a voyage of nearly 5,000 nautical miles. The joint mobile formation returned to the station on the morning of April 3.

On April 9, 2013, the Hengshui and Yueyang were inspected by Xi Jinping, Chairman of the Central Military Commission of the Communist Party of China, on behalf of the Ninth Detachment of the Destroyer. On April 10, Hengshui and Lanzhou returned to the waters of the Western Pacific to carry out offensive and defensive exercises in the open sea, including air defense, anti-submarine, and sea strikes. The formation arrived on the 118th anniversary of the signing of the Shimonoseki Treaty on April 17 and arrived in the waters near the Diaoyu Islands for cruise. The open sea training lasted 11 days, with a total voyage of more than 3,000 nautical miles. Hengshui would return to a certain military port in Sanya on April 20.

On August 8, 2013, Hengshui, Jinggang Shan and Taihu formed the 15th escort fleet of the Chinese Navy from Zhanjiang City, Guangdong Province to the Gulf of Aden, Somali waters took over from the fourteenth batch of escort formations to perform escort missions. After 169 days and nights of the escort, Hengshui and others arrived in Zhanjiang on the morning of January 23, 2014 after completing the escort missions of 46 batches of 181 Chinese and foreign ships and their missions to Tanzania, Kenya, and Sri Lanka.

In mid-January 2014, the formation of Hengshui, Liuzhou, Yueyang and Sanya completed several offensive and defensive exercises in the training waters. On May 5, 2014, Hengshui and Lanzhou met with USS Blue Ridge while performing missions in the waters off Huangyan Island.  On June 5, 2014, the Qiongyangpu No. 13073 fishing boat lost contact. After receiving the search and rescue order, the Hengshui ship of a destroyer detachment, which was performing a training mission in a certain area of the South China Sea, rushed to the sea area where the fishing boat was missing to conduct search and rescue operations. A search and rescue aircraft dispatched by a certain aviation unit of the South China Fleet of the Navy was the first to spot the fishing boat and report the situation to the Hengshui ship. After the Hengshui ship-borne helicopter arrived at the sea area where the incident occurred, it dropped supplies to 14 fishermen in distress on boats and life rafts. After the Hengshui ship and the South China Sea Rescue 115 arrived, they rescued all the fishermen in distress and sent them to Sanya.

Hengshui participated in RIMPAC 2016.

Gallery

References 

2011 ships
Ships built in China
Type 054 frigates